Spider-Man is an animated television series featuring the Marvel Comics superhero Spider-Man. Grantray-Lawrence Animation produced the first season, while the second and third seasons were produced by Krantz Animation, Inc. and were crafted by producer Ralph Bakshi in New York City.

The show first aired on the ABC television network on September 9, 1967; but went into syndication with the start of the third season. It ran for three seasons and finished on June 14, 1970, with a total of 52 episodes. Many of the 30-minute episodes from season 1 and season 3 were divided into two 15-minute story segments.

Series overview

Episodes

Season 1 (1967–68)
The animation for the first season of Spider-Man was produced by Grantray-Lawrence Animation. Ray Patterson was the producer. Animation was performed by Hal Ambro, Bob Bentley, and Dan Bessie, among others. Direction on episode 01 was provided by Grant Simmons, Clyde Geronimi, and Sid Marcus. Grantray-Lawrence Animation went bankrupt after producing the first 20 episodes, leaving another 32 episodes in the series order unproduced.

Most first-season episodes consisted of two story segments per half-hour episode, though the third and the eighth episodes consisted of a single episode.

Season 2 (1968–69)
After Grantray-Lawrence Animation went bankrupt, Krantz Animation, Inc. took over production for the second season of Spider-Man. Krantz Animation turned to Ralph Bakshi to take over executive producing and directing the series, which involved moving production to New York City. Bakshi wanted a series that "offered more attention to detail" and allowed "for a greater emphasis on character and plotline". Animation was performed by Clifford Augustson, Douglas Crane, and Frank Enders, among others, and Ira Turek, Lin Carter, and Fred Halliday were the writers.

Unlike the first-season episodes, all second-season episodes consisted of a single story.

Season 3 (1970)
Krantz Animation, Inc. continued to produce the third season of Spider-Man, with Ralph Bakshi continuing as executive producer and director of the series. Other crew from the second season also carried on through Spider-Mans third season.

The third-season episodes consisted of a mix of episodes with two story segments per half-hour, and single episode-length stories.

References

External links
 Spider-Man (1967) at TV Database Wiki

Lists of Spider-Man television series episodes
Lists of American children's animated television series episodes
Lists of Canadian children's animated television series episodes